Neoclypeodytes cinctellus is a species of predaceous diving beetle in the family Dytiscidae. It is found in North America and the Neotropics. It is a predator of the critically endangered Devils Hole pupfish and has distinctive brown patterning on its head and abdomen.

References

Further reading

 
 

Dytiscidae
Articles created by Qbugbot
Beetles described in 1852